4009 Drobyshevskij, provisional designation , is a carbonaceous Themistian asteroid from the outer regions of the asteroid belt, approximately  in diameter. It was discovered on 13 March 1977, by Soviet–Russian astronomer Nikolai Chernykh at the Crimean Astrophysical Observatory in Nauchnij, on the Crimean peninsula, and named after Russian astrophysicist Edward Drobyshevski. The C-type asteroid has a relatively short rotation period of 3.875 hours.

Orbit and classification 

Drobyshevskij is a core member of the Themis family, a very large family of carbonaceous asteroids, named after 24 Themis, the family's parent body. It orbits the Sun in the outer main-belt at a distance of 2.7–3.6 AU once every 5 years and 7 months (2,032 days; semi-major axis of 3.14 AU). Its orbit has an eccentricity of 0.13 and an inclination of 2° with respect to the ecliptic.

The body's observation arc begins with a precovery taken at the Goethe Link Observatory in November 1963, more than 13 years prior to its official discovery observation at Crimea–Nauchnij.

Physical characteristics 

Drobyshevskij has been characterized as a C-type asteroid by Pan-STARRS photometric survey. CALL also assumes it to be a carbonaceous C-type, according to the Themistian asteroid's overall spectral type.

Rotation period 

Three rotational lightcurves of Drobyshevskij were obtained from photometric observations by astronomers at the Palomar Transient Factory in California. Lightcurve analysis gave a rotation period between 3.87 and 3.882 hours with a brightness amplitude between 0.31 and 0.38 magnitude. The Collaborative Asteroid Lightcurve Link (CALL) adopts a period of 3.875 hours from observations made in the S-band as the best result. While not being a fast rotator, the body's period is relatively short.

Diameter and albedo 

According to the surveys carried out by the Japanese Akari satellite and the NEOWISE mission of NASA's Wide-field Infrared Survey Explorer, Drobyshevskij measures between 16.31 and 18.198 kilometers in diameter and its surface has an albedo between 0.044 and 0.071. CALL assumes an albedo of 0.08 and calculates a diameter of 14.19 kilometers based on an absolute magnitude of 12.6.

Naming 

This minor planet was named after Edward Drobyshevski (1936–2012), who was a Russian astrophysicist at the Ioffe Institute of the Russian Academy of Sciences in Saint Petersburg, Russia. He is known for his cosmogonical models and theories about the origin of the small Solar System bodies as well as for his research on stellar magnetic fields. The official naming citation was published by the Minor Planet Center on 18 February 1992.

References

External links 
 Asteroid Lightcurve Database (LCDB), query form (info )
 Dictionary of Minor Planet Names, Google books
 Asteroids and comets rotation curves, CdR – Observatoire de Genève, Raoul Behrend
 Discovery Circumstances: Numbered Minor Planets (1)-(5000) – Minor Planet Center
 
 

004009
Discoveries by Nikolai Chernykh
Named minor planets
19770313